"Diet Coke" is a song by American rapper Pusha T. It was released on February 8, 2022 as the lead single from his fourth studio album It's Almost Dry (2022). Produced by Kanye West and 88-Keys, the song references cocaine and drug dealing.

Background
On February 7, 2022, 88-Keys revealed that he produced the instrumental of the song in 2004, as an interlude for his beat tape, The Makings of Crack-Cocaine.

The cover art of the single was designed by Sterling Ruby. It shows a "mash-up of melting faces with crude metallic letters" spelling "Diet Coke".

Composition and lyrics
The song begins with a sample of rapper Fat Joe yelling, "Yesterday's price is not today's price". Over a piano-driven boom bap beat, Pusha T raps about selling cocaine and references his tough upbringing: "Imaginary players ain't been coached right / Master recipes under stove lights / The number on this jersey is the quote price / You ordered Diet Coke, that's a joke, right?" He declares his appreciation for Kanye West as well ("Far as I'm concerned, who's the best? Me and Yezos").

Critical reception
Complex writers Eric Skelton, Andre Gee and Jessica McKinney positively reviewed the song. Skelton and McKinney praised the beat, while Gee praised how Pusha T raps only about one topic and can "still come off sounding fresh". All three writers also expressed approval toward how Pusha does not diss rapper Drake in the song.

Music video
The music video was released on February 8, 2022. It was shot in black-and-white and directed by Omar Jones. It sees Pusha T rapping as Kanye West dances in the white background, and reclining on a sofa.

Live performances
Pusha T first unveiled the song during a performance at Nigo's Kenzo Paris Fashion Week show in January 2022. In March 2022, he performed the song at The Late Show with Stephen Colbert.

Remixes
American rappers Jim Jones and Fabolous released a freestyle of the song on February 16, 2022.

Charts

References

2022 singles
2022 songs
Pusha T songs
Def Jam Recordings singles
Song recordings produced by Kanye West
Songs about cocaine
Songs written by Pusha T
Songs written by Kanye West
Songs written by Fat Joe
Songs written by Jerry Butler
Songs written by Marvin Yancy